Bălan is a Romanian surname, Balan a Bulgarian, Indian and Italian one. Notable people with these surnames include:

Balan
 Aleksandar Teodorov-Balan (1859–1959), Bulgarian linguist
 Aparna Balan (born 1986), Indian Badminton player
 Pietro Balan (1840–1893), Italian Catholic historian
 Vidya Balan (born 1979), Bollywood actress

Bălan
 Bogdan Bălan (born 1979), Romanian rugby player
 Dan Bălan (born 1979), Moldavian pop singer and songwriter
 Daniel Bălan (born 1979), Romanian football (soccer) player
 Eugen Bălan (1904–1968), Romanian writer
 Grigore Bălan (1896–1944), Romanian general
 Ioan Bălan (11 February 1880 – 4 August 1959), Romanian bishop of the Greek-Catholic Church, beatified personally by Pope Francis at Liberty Field in Blaj, Romania on 2 June 2019
 Ioana M. Bălan (born 1970), Romanian university professor, niece of Bishop Ioan Bălan
 Lucian Bălan (1959–2015), Romanian football player and coach
 Nicolae Bălan (1882–1955), Romanian metropolitan bishop
 Petru Bălan (born 1976), Romanian rugby player
 Tiberiu Bălan (born 1981), Romanian football player

See also
 Balun (disambiguation)

Romanian-language surnames